Charles Hill Mailes (25 May 1870 – 17 February 1937) was a Canadian actor of the silent era.

Biography
 
Born in Halifax, Nova Scotia, in 1870, Mailes appeared in 290 films between 1909 and 1935. He married the actress Claire McDowell in 1906 and the happy couple appeared in numerous silent films together including The Mark of Zorro (1920). They had two sons, Robert and Eugene. He died in Los Angeles, California, in 1937.

Selected filmography

 At the Altar (1909, Short)
 A Mohawk's Way (1910, Short) - Indian
 Out from the Shadow (1911, Short) - At Dance
 Swords and Hearts (1911, Short) - Bushwhacker (uncredited)
 The Battle (1911, Short) - The Union Commander
 The Miser's Heart (1911, Short) - Second Crook
 A Woman Scorned (1911, Short) - A Policeman
 The Eternal Mother (1912, Short) - Mary's Father
 For His Son (1912, Short) - The Father - a Physician
 An Unseen Enemy (1912)
 Under Burning Skies (1912, Short) - In Bar / At Farewell Party
 A String of Pearls (1912, Short) - The Rich Doctor
 The Goddess of Sagebrush Gulch (1912) 
 Won by a Fish (1912)
 The Lesser Evil (1912) 
 Just Like a Woman (1912)
 A Beast at Bay (1912)
 A Temporary Truce (1912) 
 Man's Lust for Gold (1912) 
 The Sands of Dee (1912)
 The Inner Circle (1912) 
 With the Enemy's Help (1912) 
 A Change of Spirit (1912) 
 Friends (1912) 
 The Root of Evil (1912)
 So Near, yet So Far (1912) 
 A Feud in the Kentucky Hills (1912) 
 In the Aisles of the Wild (1912) 
 The Painted Lady (1912) 
 A Sailor's Heart (1912) 
 Brutality (1912) 
 The New York Hat (1912) 
 My Hero (1912) 
 The God Within (1912)
 The Telephone Girl and the Lady (1913) 
 Pirate Gold (1913) 
 An Adventure in the Autumn Woods (1913) 
 A Misappropriated Turkey (1913) 
 Brothers (1913) 
 Oil and Water (1913) 
 A Chance Deception (1913) 
 The Wrong Bottle (1913) 
 The Unwelcome Guest (1913) 
 Near to Earth (1913)  
 Fate (1913)
 A Welcome Intruder (1913)
 The Sheriff's Baby (1913)
 The Hero of Little Italy (1913) 
 A Misunderstood Boy (1913) 
 The Wanderer (1913) 
 The Stolen Loaf (1913) 
 The House of Darkness (1913) 
 Olaf—An Atom (1913) 
 A Dangerous Foe (1913) 
 The Ranchero's Revenge (1913) 
 Just Gold (1913) 
 Red Hicks Defies the World (1913) 
 The Mothering Heart (1913) 
 The Mistake (1913) 
 When Love Forgives (1913) 
 Two Men of the Desert (1913) 
 A Woman in the Ultimate (1913) 
 A Modest Hero (1913) 
 Madonna of the Storm (1913) 
 The Battle at Elderbush Gulch (1913)
 The Yaqui Cur (1913)
 Almost a Wild Man (1913)
 Judith of Bethulia (1914)
 Brute Force (1914) 
 Lord Chumley (1914)
 The Eagle's Wings (1916)
 The Lash of Power (1917)
 The Girl Who Won Out (1917)
 The Spotted Lily (1917)
 The Mysterious Mrs. M (1917)
 The Lair of the Wolf (1917)
 Money Madness (1917)
 The Bronze Bride (1917)
 Beloved Jim (1917)
 The Winged Mystery (1917)
 Polly Redhead (1917)
 Southern Justice (1917)
 Come Through (1917)
 The Brass Bullet (1918) 
 Three Mounted Men (1918) 
 The Girl Who Wouldn't Quit (1918)
 The Fighting Grin (1918)
 The Magic Eye (1918)
 The Talk of the Town (1918) 
 The Lure of the Circus (1918) 
 Fools and Their Money (1919)
 The Outcasts of Poker Flat (1919)
 Our Better Selves (1919)
 Full of Pep (1919)
 The Speed Maniac (1919)
 Haunting Shadows (1919)
 Go and Get It (1920)
 Homespun Folks (1920)
 The Mark of Zorro (1920)
 Chickens (1921)
 The Home Stretch (1921)
 The Spotted Lily (1917)
 Uncharted Seas (1921)
 Courage (1921)
 The Ten Dollar Raise (1921)
 The Lying Truth (1922)
 The Man from Downing Street (1922)
 Crashin' Thru (1923)
 The Bond Boy (1923)
 Held to Answer (1923)
 East Side - West Side (1923)
 Name the Man (1924)
 The Lighthouse by the Sea (1924)
 Thundering Hoofs (1924)
 When a Man's a Man (1924)
 The Fighting Demon (1925)
 The Crimson Runner (1925)
 Old Ironsides (1926)
 The Frontier Trail (1926) 
 The Combat (1926)
 The Man in the Saddle (1926)
 The Social Highwayman (1926)
 Hearts and Fists (1926)
 The Better Man (1926)
 Exclusive Rights (1926)
 The Blue Streak (1926)
 Play Safe (1927)
 Somewhere in Sonora (1927)
 Bitter Apples (1927)
 Great Mail Robbery (1927)
 What a Night! (1928)
 Give and Take (1928)
 The Charge of the Gauchos (1928)
Queen of the Chorus (1928)
 The Bellamy Trial (1929)
 The Faker (1929)
 Lilies of the Field (1930)
 Murder by Television (1935)

References

External links

1870 births
1937 deaths
Canadian male silent film actors
Canadian male film actors
Male actors from Halifax, Nova Scotia
20th-century Canadian male actors
Canadian expatriate male actors in the United States